CD320 (cluster of differentiation 320) is a human gene.

References

Further reading

External links
 
 
 

Clusters of differentiation